Reality Entertainment is a Philippine production company founded and managed by the Filipino filmmaker Erik Matti and his producing partner Dondon Monteverde (son of the film producer Lily Monteverde).

Filmography

References

Film production companies of the Philippines
Companies based in Makati